The 1954 Connecticut gubernatorial election was held on November 2, 1954. Democratic nominee Abraham Ribicoff narrowly defeated incumbent Republican John Davis Lodge with 49.50% of the vote.

General election

Candidates
Major party candidates
Abraham Ribicoff, Democratic
John Davis Lodge, Republican

Other candidates
Jasper McLevy, Socialist

Results

References

1954
Connecticut